Philippe Xavier Christian Ignace Marie Barbarin (born 17 October 1950) is a French Roman Catholic prelate who was the Archbishop of Lyon from 2002 to 2020. He was made a cardinal in 2003. He was charged in 2017 and convicted in 2019 of failing to report sex abuse allegedly committed by a priest and was given a suspended six-month prison sentence. On 24 June 2019, Barbarin lost his status as leader of the Archdiocese of Lyon, though he retained the title of Archbishop. His conviction was overturned on appeal on 30 January 2020, but Pope Francis accepted Barbarin's resignation as Archbishop of Lyon on 6 March 2020.

Biography

Early life and career
Philippe Barbarin was born in 1950 in Rabat, French Morocco, then a French protectorate, into a large family with six sisters, two of whom are nuns, and four brothers. Barbarin studied at the public Lycée Marcellin Berthelot in Saint-Maur and then in Paris at the Catholic Collège des Francs-Bourgeois, where he completed his baccalaureate. He studied philosophy at the Major Seminary of Paris, the Institute for Comparative Philosophy, and the Sorbonne, interrupted for a time by military service. In 1973 he entered the Institut Catholique de Paris, where he earned a  theology bachelor. He was ordained on 17 December 1977 by Bishop Robert de Provenchères of Créteil.

Barbarin held a variety of pastoral assignments in France until 1994, when he taught theology in the Archdiocese of Fianarantsoa, Madagascar.

Episcopal career
On 1 October 1998, he was appointed Bishop of Moulins. He received his episcopal consecration on the following 22 November from the Jesuit Archbishop Philibert Randriambololona of Fianarantsoa, with Bishops André Quélen and Daniel Labille serving as co-consecrators.

Barbarin was named Archbishop of Lyon on 16 July 2002. He was created Cardinal-Priest of SS. Trinità al Monte Pincio by Pope John Paul II in the consistory of 21 October 2003. On 24 November 2003 he was made a member of the Congregation for Divine Worship and the Discipline of the Sacraments and the Congregation for Institutes of Consecrated Life and Societies of Apostolic Life. He was one of the cardinal electors who participated in the 2005 papal conclave that elected Pope Benedict XVI and in the 2013 conclave that elected Pope Francis.

In addition to his native French, Barbarin speaks Italian, English, Spanish, German, and Malagasy.

Activities
In 2010, Barbarin created a programme at the diocesan seminary to prepare for the priesthood any Francophone candidate who wished, in accordance with the tradition in which he was raised, to celebrate Mass according to the 1962 Roman Missal.

In November 2012, as France prepared to legalize same-sex marriage, he told Osservatore Romano: "Everyone knows marriage is the union between a man and a woman. The parliaments of the 21st century cannot change that.... I and many other priests are engaged in dialogue with a number of homosexual people. They know they are loved and that they will always be welcome. I would remind them however that God watches over and says to everyone: 'You are precious in my eyes.' I hope that everyone listens to Christ's call and are helped to reciprocate."

In July 2015, he led the bishops of the Rhône-Alpes region in calling for a Reims hospital to maintain the life support systems of Vincent Lambert, a man who had been in a coma for seven years.

He has been "at the forefront of Islamic-Christian dialogue". In 2013, accompanied by the Imam of Lyon, he visited the village of Tibhirine, Algeria, where some Trappist monks were assassinated in 1996. In July 2014, he visited Mosul and Erbil and other villages in Iraq as well as refugee camps for displaced Christians.

Health
Barbarin suffered a double heart attack on a flight from Lyon to 2013 World Youth Day in Rio de Janeiro. He was taken to a hospital in Cayenne, French Guiana, where he received a coronary angiography. He was transferred to Fort de France, Martinique, where he underwent a triple bypass operation on 23 July 2013.

Handling sexual abuse
Barbarin, and several now deceased archbishops of Lyon before him, did not report to civil authorities the sexual abuse committed by priest Bernard Preynat during boy scout outings between 1986 and 1991. Failure to report such crimes to police is by itself a crime under French law. Barbarin, four of his subordinates, and Gerhard Ludwig Cardinal Müller, Prefect of the Congregation for the Doctrine of the Faith in the Vatican, were defendants in a lawsuit by the former boy scouts abused by Preynat. A judge conducted a preliminary inquiry. On 1 August 2016, the prosecuting attorney dropped the case largely based on concerns about the statute of limitations. However, Barbarin and six other priests were charged in 2017 for their failure to report the incidents to the civil authorities. The trial was scheduled to begin on 4 April 2018, but was postponed.

Prosecutor Charlotte Trabut announced that she would not file charges because the statute of limitations had passed for some charges and there was insufficient evidence to support conviction. The victims invoked their right to press charges, and Barbarin's trial began on 7 January 2019. Five priests accused of assisting Barbarin in the cover-up were co-defendants. The trial ended on 10 January, and, on 7 March, Barbarin was found guilty and given a suspended prison sentence of six months. His co-defendants were acquitted. Barbarin's attorney said his client would appeal the verdict. Barbarin said he intended to meet with Pope Francis and resign as Archbishop of Lyon. Barbarin was reported to have planned to resign "for the good of the Archdiocese" no matter what the verdict.

Post-trial status
Barbarin submitted his resignation to Pope Francis in person on 18 March 2019. Francis, "invoking the presumption of innocence", refused the resignation and asked Barbarin to take whatever action he thought appropriate. Barbarin announced on 19 March that Yves Baumgarten, vicar general of the Archdiocese, would replace him temporarily.

On 24 June 2019, Pope Francis named Michel Dubost, Bishop emeritus of Evry-Corbeil-Essonnes, to serve as apostolic administrator sede plena of the Archdiocese, which meant Dubost had authority over the affairs of the archdiocese while Barbarin retained his archbishop's title. Barbarin's conviction was overturned on appeal on 30 January 2020. The appeals court accepted Barbarin's arguments that the law did not require him to report the allegations to authorities because he learned of their allegations when Preynat's victims were adults and that he had not discouraged them making their allegations directly to the police. Barbarin said he planned to meet with Pope Francis to submit his resignation again.

Pope Francis accepted his resignation on 6 March 2020. On 16 March 2020, Preynat was convicted of sexually assaulting boy scouts and given a five-year prison sentence.

In popular culture 
Barbarin was played by François Marthouret in the French film By the Grace of God, which chronicled a sex abuse scandal involving the Archdiocese of Lyon.

See also
 Catholic Church in France
 List of the Roman Catholic dioceses of France

Notes

References

External links

 
 bio on fiu.edu
 Philippe Barbarin bio
 

1950 births
Archbishops of Lyon
Bishops of Moulins
Cardinals created by Pope John Paul II
Living people
People from Rabat
21st-century French cardinals
Catholic Church sexual abuse scandals in France